Cristian Costel Melinte (born 9 May 1988) is a Romanian professional footballer who plays as a full back.

Club career
He began his career at Fortuna Covaci, but just some months later he went to play for Auxerre Lugoj in Liga II. Then he joined UTA Arad in 2005, playing three times in his first season and four times in the following one, in Liga I. He then was sent on loan to CS Ineu and then returned to UTA Arad in early 2008 playing regularly with the side. In late 2008 he joined AS Monaco FC for an unsuccessful trial, and then left to join FC Dinamo București later in March 2009.

Career in Italy
He was acquired by Palermo in a free transfer in August 2009, after a successful trial with the Sicilians, being awarded a four-year contract with the rosanero club.

He made his debut on 29 October 2009, playing the first half in a Serie A game ended in a 3–5 away loss to Inter. After playing a Coppa Italia home game against Reggina, he was again featured in the Italian Serie A on 30 January 2010 as a replacement for injured Federico Balzaretti in an away game versus Bari. Melinte's performance was then verbally criticized by club chairman Maurizio Zamparini after the Romanian caused a penalty (then scored) with the game being 2–2, and then making a mistake that was instrumental in Bari's fourth goal. Two days later, he was sent out on loan to Serie B club Piacenza in switch with Marco Calderoni.

He returned at Palermo at the end of his loan spell, but no interested party was found and he was subsequently excluded from the first team. On 31 August 2011 he moved on loan to Petrolul Ploiești. On 3 July 2012, he was loaned to Astra Giurgiu, until the end of the season.

References

External links
 
 
 Player profile at UEFA

1988 births
Living people
Sportspeople from Timișoara
Romanian footballers
Romania under-21 international footballers
Romania youth international footballers
FC UTA Arad players
FC Dinamo București players
Palermo F.C. players
Piacenza Calcio 1919 players
FC Petrolul Ploiești players
FC Astra Giurgiu players
CS Concordia Chiajna players
FC Politehnica Iași (2010) players
ACS Poli Timișoara players
Association football defenders
Romanian expatriate footballers
Expatriate footballers in Italy
Romanian expatriate sportspeople in Italy
Liga I players
Liga II players
Serie A players
Serie B players